This is a list of seasons played by Hannover 96 in German and European football, from their entry into the Südkreisliga to the present day. The club were champions in 1937–38 and 1953–54.

Seasons

Notes

External links
Hannover 96 at worldfootball.net

Seasons
German football club statistics
German football club seasons